The Standards Organisation of Nigeria is the main statutory body responsible for standardising and regulating the quality of all products in Nigeria.

Functions and mandate 
The functions of SON includes but are not limited to the following:

 certifying products
 creating policies for production quality of goods and services
 assessing quality assurance activities, including certification of systems, products and laboratories throughout Nigeria
 designating, approving and declaring standards in respect of metrology, materials, commodities, structures and processes.
 certifying commercial and industrial products throughout Nigeria
 registering and regulating standard marks and specifications etc.
 investigating product quality 
 enforcing standards and sanctioning violators
 compiling inventory of products in Nigeria requiring standardization
 monitoring the standard of imported and exported products
 improving measurement accuracies and circulation of information relating to standards

Establishment 
SON was established under Enabling Act Number 56 of December 1971, although it started functioning January 1, 1970. The Act has been amended thrice: Act Number 20 of 1976, Act Number 32 of 1984 and Act Number 18 of 1990. SON is a member of the International Organization for Standardization.

History 

 At the 50th anniversary of the agency, the Director General of the Organization announced that the agency has adopted 213 Nigerian Industrial Standards to put proliferation of fake products in check.

References 

Government agencies of Nigeria
Quality assurance